ZINEBI, also known as the International Festival of Documentary and Short Film of Bilbao, is an annual international film festival that has been held in Bilbao since 1959. It is dedicated to documentary, animations and other short film forms.

It is the only Class-A international documentary festival recognised by the FIAPF in Spain. It has also been accredited by the Academy of Motion Pictures Arts and Sciences as a qualifier for the Oscars and is a qualifier for the BAFTAs awarded by the British cinema industry and for the Spanish Goyas.

Organised by the Teatro Arriaga, the festival has currently institutional financing and sponsorship from Bilbao City Council.

References

External links
 Official website

Film festivals in Spain
Documentary film festivals in Spain
Short film festivals
Tourist attractions in Bilbao
1959 establishments in Spain
Annual events in Spain